Khamsian (also Romanized as Khamsīān and Kham Sīān; also known as Mazra‘eh-ye Khām Sīāh) is a village in Kezab Rural District, Khezrabad District, Saduq County, Yazd Province, Iran. At the 2006 census, its population was 185, in 50 families.

References 

Populated places in Saduq County